Kerala floods or Kerala flood may refer to:

 1341 Floods in Kerala
 2018 Kerala floods
 2019 Kerala floods
 2020 Kerala floods
 Great flood of 99